Alien land laws were a series of legislative attempts to discourage Asian and other "non-desirable" immigrants from settling permanently in U.S. states and territories by limiting their ability to own land and property. Because the Naturalization Act of 1870 had extended citizenship rights only to African Americans but not other ethnic groups, these laws relied on coded language excluding "aliens ineligible for citizenship" to prohibit primarily Chinese and Japanese immigrants from becoming landowners without explicitly naming any racial group. Various alien land laws existed in over a dozen states. Like other discriminatory measures aimed at preventing minorities from establishing homes and businesses in certain areas, such as redlining and restrictive covenants, many alien land laws remained technically in effect, forgotten or ignored, for many years after enforcement of the laws fell out of practice.

Background

Resentment against Asian immigrants in the U.S. grew with their population. Although American businesses had initially recruited Chinese immigrants as a cheap labor source in the emerging railroad and mining industries (and, in the Reconstruction South, to replace slaves on sugar plantations) by the late 19th century, fears of a largescale "Mongolian" plot to take land and resources from white Americans became widespread. Contemporary newspapers and politicians cultivated the idea of a Yellow Peril: an imminent threat to white morality and economic interests posed by Chinese and other Asian immigrants. Nativist groups prevented the Naturalization Act of 1870 from granting citizenship rights (and therefore the ability to vote and serve on juries) to Asians, and successfully campaigned for laws to reduce and finally, with the Chinese Exclusion Act of 1882, stop immigration from China. 

The end of Chinese immigration came around the same time as the opening of Japan, when Japanese citizens were for the first time in the nation's history allowed to emigrate to other countries, and Japanese soon replaced Chinese as the primary target for labor recruiters. New Japanese immigrants, including many recently released from indentured labor contracts with Hawaiian plantations, moved to rural areas in Western states and took up tenant farming, taking over land formerly occupied by Chinese farmers. The sharp increase in the population of Japanese residing in the U.S. and their success in the agricultural industry soon resulted in an exclusionary movement similar to that faced by the earlier wave of primarily Chinese workers. Following the pattern set by the anti-Chinese movement, anti-Japanese lobbyists first limited Japanese immigration to the U.S. with the Gentlemen's Agreement of 1907 and then stopped East Asian immigration completely with the Immigration Act of 1924. The Cable Act of 1922 added further complications to the ban on citizenship for Asian immigrants, stripping U.S.-born women of their citizenship if they married men ineligible for naturalization. Meanwhile, alien land laws became a common tool to prevent Asian immigrants already in the country from becoming a permanent presence in hostile white communities.

List of laws

Arkansas
1943 - Arkansas, home to two incarceration sites, passed a law specifically barring any "Japanese or a descendant of a Japanese" from purchasing land in that state, though by including citizen Nisei within its scope, it was not a true alien land law.

California
 1879 - The state revises its constitution to limit the ownership of land to aliens who are of "the white race or of African descent."
 1913 - California's Alien Land Law prohibits aliens ineligible for citizenship from owning property or entering into leases longer than three years.
 1920 - Further restrictions are added to the 1913 law, making any lease agreement with an ineligible alien illegal and barring companies owned by ineligible aliens from purchasing land.

Florida
 2008 voters rejected amendment to remove alien land law
 November 2018 voted on again and the repeal was approved by the voters.

Minnesota
1887 - The state legislature limits ownership of real estate to citizens and "those who have lawfully declared their intentions to become such," and prevents companies with more than 20 percent alien ownership from purchasing land.
1897-1911 - A series of exceptions to the 1887 law are enacted, allowing alien-owned corporations to hold land so long as it is being sold to "actual settlers" or being used for legitimate business purposes.

Nebraska
1841 - The Preemption Act allows settlers to file a "preemptive" claim on up to 160 acres of land, protecting their title against subsequent claims on the tract. Claimants must provide proof of citizenship or a declaration to obtain citizenship in order to file for preemption.
1862 - The Homestead Act, which allows settlers to claim up to 160 acres of land on which they live and work, includes a requirement that homesteaders be citizens or have filed for citizenship.
1904 - The Kincaid Act, another homestead law allowing settlers to claim up to 640 acres of land in the western and central parts of the state less conducive to small-plot farming and ranching, uses the same citizenship requirement as the previous laws.

Oregon
1859 - Oregon rewrites its constitution to state that no "Chinaman" can own property in the state.
1923 - After three failed attempts to pass laws limiting land and property rights to citizens and those eligible for naturalization, an act based on the California model is pushed through the state legislature.
1945 - Oregon enacted a law forbidding Issei from not only working on farms owned by their children, but forbade them from living with their children or even stepping onto their children's farm fields. Later, in 1947, it was unanimously declared unconstitutional by Oregon's Supreme Court.

Texas
 1891 - Texas passes a law prohibiting aliens or alien-owned companies from holding property for more than six years (aliens eligible for naturalization are exempt if they obtain citizenship before the end of the six year grace period). The law is repealed as unconstitutional later that same year.
 1892 - A new law extends the previous time limit from six to ten years and removes the restriction against corporations owned by aliens.
 1921 - The state essentially returns to the restrictions of the 1891 law, once again prohibiting alien-owned companies from obtaining property and reducing the time limit on holding land from ten to five years.

Utah
1943 - After the Topaz War Relocation Center was established in Utah, the legislature passed a land law prohibiting land purchase by aliens, allowing only a yearly lease. This law was repealed in 1947.

Washington
 1886 - Passed the same year as a race riot in which Seattle's Chinese population was displaced by a mob of angry whites, Washington Territory writes a constitutional provision barring aliens ineligible for citizenship from owning property.
 1889 - A statute requiring aliens to declare an intent to naturalize "in good faith" in order to buy property is added to the territory's constitution, refining the 1886 law.
 1921 - An alien land bill modeled after the California law is passed in the state legislature after failing to make it onto the 1920 ballot. As in California, ineligible aliens were prohibited from leasing land. 
 1923 - The 1921 law is expanded to prevent the U.S.-born children of immigrants from holding land in trust for their parents.
 1967 - The Washington state legislature repeals the 1921 alien land law.

Wyoming
 1943 - Wyoming, which was home to the Heart Mountain Relocation Center, a camp for Japanese Americans removed from the West Coast during World War II, passed alien land laws in order to prevent former camp inmates from resettling in Wyoming. This land law was repealed in 2001.

Other states
 1921 - Arizona and Louisiana  pass alien land acts. New Mexico voters approve an amendment to the state constitution that prohibits ineligible aliens from owning property in the state.
 1923 - Idaho and Montana pass alien land laws. 
 1925 - Kansas and Arkansas write their own laws restricting property rights.

Related court cases
 Yamashita v. Washington (1902) — Takuji Yamashita filed a brief with the Washington State Supreme Court after being denied the ability to practice law on the grounds that he was ineligible for naturalization and therefore ineligible to become an attorney under the Washington Bar's requirements. The court ruled unanimously against him.
 California v. Harada (1918) — The state supreme court ruled in favor of Jukichi Harada, who with his wife had purchased a home in the name of their three American-born children, finding that the children's citizenship gave them the right to own real property despite their status as minors.
 Ozawa v. United States (1922) — Takao Ozawa petitioned for citizenship, arguing that people of Japanese descent were included in the "white race" and therefore eligible for naturalization. The Supreme Court ruled against Ozawa.
 Yamashita v. Hinkle (1922) — Decided the same day as the Ozawa case, the Supreme Court upheld a Washington state alien land law challenged by Takuji Yamashita.
 Estate of Tetsubumi Yano (1922) — The California Supreme Court found that a non-citizen parent had guardianship rights over agricultural land owned in the name of his Nisei daughter.
 Webb v. O'Brien (1923) — Overturning a lower court decision, the Supreme Court upheld a ban on cropping contracts, which technically dealt with labor rather than land and were used by many Issei to avoid the restrictions of California's alien land act.
 Porterfield v. Webb and Terrace v. Thompson (1923) — Two Supreme Court cases in which bans on leasing to ineligible aliens in Washington and California were ruled constitutional.
 Washington v. Hirabayashi (1925) — Washington's Supreme Court decided that the land purchased in the name of a Nisei but managed primarily by an Issei-owned company must revert to the state.
 Oyama v. California (1948) — The Supreme Court ruled that Fred Oyama's 14th Amendment rights had been violated when the state of California moved to repossess land purchased by Oyama's non-citizen father in his son's name while the family was in camp. However, the 1913 and 1920 alien land laws used by the state to justify the escheat filing, while weakened, were not struck down at this time.
 Takahashi v. California Fish and Game Commission (1948) — Torao Takahashi, an Issei fisherman who was denied a fishing license upon his return to Terminal Island after being released from camp in 1945, successfully challenged a state law that declared aliens ineligible for citizenship could not obtain a commercial fishing license.
 Fujii v. California (1952) — The California Supreme Court ruled that California's 1920 Alien Land Law, and others like it, violated the equal protection clause of the 14th Amendment. Although enforcement of the California law had essentially stopped after the Oyama decision in 1948, the ruling in that case had not addressed the constitutionality of the law but only the individual rights of Fred Oyama. The Fujii ruling dealt directly with the legislation itself, therefore nullifying alien land laws.
 Masaoka v. California (1952) — Issued three months after the Fujii decision officially branded such laws unconstitutional, the California Supreme Court upheld a lower court's ruling against California's Alien Land Law.

See also
 California Alien Land Law of 1913
 Yellow Peril
 Chinese Exclusion Act
 Immigration Act of 1924
 Anti-Chinese sentiment in the United States
 Anti-Japanese sentiment in the United States

References

External links
 Lyon, Cherstin M. "Alien land laws" Densho Encyclopedia.
 Robinson, Greg. "Fujii v. California" Densho Encyclopedia.
 How residents of Locke, California, the last rural Chinese town in America, lived under the Alien Land laws: "Bitter Melon: Inside America's Last Rural Chinese Town" 

Politics and race in the United States
Anti-Asian sentiment in the United States
Anti-Chinese sentiment in the United States
Anti-Japanese sentiment in the United States
Chinese-American history
Japanese-American history
History of immigration to the United States
Legal history of the United States
Asian-American issues
Property law
Land law